Arthurson is a surname meaning "son of Arthur". Notable people with the surname include:

Charles Arthurson, Canadian Anglican bishop
Ken Arthurson (born 1929), Australian rugby league player

See also
Arthurson Bluff, cliff of Victoria Land, Antarctica
Arthurson Ridge, ridge of Oates Land, Antarctica